Székesfehérvár, known colloquially as Fehérvár ("white castle"), is a city in central Hungary, and the country's ninth-largest city. It is the regional capital of Central Transdanubia, and the centre of Fejér County and Székesfehérvár District. The area is an important rail and road junction between Lake Balaton and Lake Velence.

Székesfehérvár, a royal residence (székhely), as capital of the Kingdom of Hungary, held a central role in the Middle Ages. As required by the Doctrine of the Holy Crown, the first kings of Hungary were crowned and buried here. Significant trade routes led to the Balkans and Italy, and to Buda and Vienna.

History

Pre-Hungarian
The place has been inhabited since the 5th century BC. In Roman times the settlements were called Gorsium and Herculia. After the Migration Period Fejér County was the part of the Avar Khaganate, while the Slavic and Great Moravian presence is disputed. (There is no source for the name of the place before the late 10th century.) In the Middle Ages its Latin name was Alba Regalis/Alba Regia. The town was an important traffic junction between Lake Balaton and Lake Velence, several trade routes led from here to the Balkans and Italy, and to Buda and Vienna. (Today, the town is a junction of seven railroad lines.)

Early Hungarian

Grand Prince Géza of the Árpád dynasty was the nominal overlord of all seven Magyar tribes but in reality ruled only part of the united territory. He aimed to integrate Hungary into Christian Western Europe by rebuilding the state according to the Western political and social models.  Géza founded the Hungarian town in 972 on four moorland islands between the Gaja stream and its tributary, the Sárvíz, one of the most important Hungarian tributaries of the Danube. He also had a small stone castle built. Székesfehérvár was first mentioned in a document by the Bishopric of Veszprém, 1009, as Alba Civitas.

Stephen I of Hungary granted town rights to the settlement, surrounded the town with a plank wall, and founded a school and a monastery. Under his rule the construction of the Romanesque Székesfehérvár Basilica began (it was built between 1003 and 1038). The settlement had about 3,500 inhabitants at this time and was the royal seat for hundreds of years. 43 kings were crowned in Székesfehérvár (the last one in 1526) and 15 kings were buried here (the last one in 1540).

In the 12th century, the town prospered, churches, monasteries, and houses were built. It was an important station on the pilgrim route to the Holy Land. András II issued the Golden Bull here in 1222. The Bull included the rights of nobles and the duties of the king, and the Constitution of Hungary was based on it until 1848. It is often compared to England's Magna Carta.

During the Mongol Invasion of Hungary (1241–1242), the invaders could not get close to the castle: Kadan ruled Mongol warriors could not get through the surrounding marshes because of flooding caused by melting snow. In the 13th–15th centuries, the town prospered, and several palaces were built. In the 14th century, Székesfehérvár was surrounded by city walls.

After the death of King Mátyás (1490), the German army of 20,000 men of Maximilian invaded Hungary. They advanced into the heart of Hungary and captured the city of Székesfehérvár, which he sacked, as well as the tomb of King Mátyás, which was kept there. His Landsknechts were still unsatisfied with the plunder and refused to go for taking Buda. He returned to the Empire in late December and the Hungarian troops liberated Székesfehérvár in the next year.

Ottoman period

The Ottomans conquered the city after a long siege in 1543 and only after a sally ended in most of the defenders including the commander, György Varkoch, being locked out by wealthy citizens fearing they might incur the wrath of the Ottomans by a lengthy siege. 

Except for a short period in 1601 when Székesfehérvár was reconquered by an army led by Lawrence of Brindisi, the city remained under Ottoman administration for 145 years, until 1688, with the Ottomans being preoccupied with the Morean War. They named the city Belgrade ("white city", from Serbian Beograd) and built mosques. In the 16th–17th centuries it looked like a Muslim city. Most of the original population fled. It was a sanjak centre in Budin Province as "İstolni Belgrad" during Ottoman rule.

Habsburg Monarchy
The city began to prosper again only in the 18th century. It had a mixed population: Hungarians, Germans, Serbs, and Moravians.

By 1702, the cathedral of Nagyboldogasszony was blown up, thus destroying the largest cathedral in Hungary at that time, and the coronation temple. By the Doctrine of the Holy Crown, all kings of Hungary were obliged to be crowned in this cathedral, and to take part in coronation ceremony in the surroundings of the cathedral. The coronations after that time were held in Pozsony (now Bratislava).

In 1703, Székesfehérvár regained the status of a free royal town. In the middle of the century, several new buildings were erected (Franciscan church and monastery, Jesuit churches, public buildings, Baroque palaces). Maria Theresa made the city an episcopal seat in 1777.

By the early 19th century, the German population was assimilated. On 15 March 1848, the citizens joined the revolution. After the revolution and war for independence, Székesfehérvár lost its importance and became a mainly agricultural city. In 1909 The Times Engineering Contract List noted a bridge construction contract valued at £12,000 to be overseen by the Chief Magistrate.

Interwar period
New prosperity arrived between the two world wars, when several new factories were opened. In 1922 a radio station was established. It used two masts insulated against ground, each with a height of 152 metres. The last mast of the station was demolished in 2009.

World War II
In 1944, after the occupation of Hungary by Nazi Germany, the city's Jewish population was confined to a ghetto and was eventually deported to the Auschwitz death camp, together with further 3,000 Jews from the area. The pre-war Jewish population consisted of Neolog (Reform) and Orthodox communities with their respective synagogues, and some of its members were active Zionists.

In December 1944, Fehérvár came under Russian artillery fire, and stiff fighting broke out as the Red Army advanced on the city.<ref>Red Army Eight Miles From Budapest.” The Times 11 December 1944; pg. 4</ref> The Germans had chosen to concentrate their forces to protect the 15-mile gap between Fehérvár and Lake Balaton. Whereas most of the gap consisted of marsh and difficult ground, Fehérvár was the node for eight highways and six railways. Despite the heavy German defences, a Russian flying column broke through and occupied the city on 23 December; the Germans were able to push them out on 22 January 1945. In March 1945, the area was the battleground for the last major German offensive of World War II; but following its failure Marshal Tolbukhin broke through the German lines once more and recaptured the city on 22 March. A Soviet airfield was established at nearby Szabadbattyán.

After WWII

In August 1951, over 150 people were killed when two trains collided in Fehérvár.

After World War II, the city was subject to industrialization, like many other cities and towns in the country. The most important factories were the Ikarus bus factory, the Videoton radio and TV factory, and the Könnyűfémmű (colloquially Köfém) aluminium processing plant, since acquired by Alcoa. By the 1970s, Székesfehérvár had swelled to more than 100,000 inhabitants (in 1945 it had only about 35,000). Several housing estates were built, but the city centre preserved its Baroque atmosphere. The most important Baroque buildings are the cathedral, the episcopal palace and the city hall.

In the past few decades, archaeologists have excavated medieval ruins (that of the Romanesque basilica and the mausoleum of St. Stephen of Hungary); they can now be visited.

At the end of the Socialist regime, all the important factories were on the verge of collapse (some eventually folded) and thousands of people lost their jobs. However, the city profited from losing the old and inefficient companies, as an abundance of skilled labour coupled with excellent traffic connections and existing infrastructure attracted numerous foreign firms seeking to invest in Hungary. Székesfehérvár became one of the prime destinations for multinational companies setting up shop in Hungary (Ford and IBM are some of them), turning the city into a success story of Hungary's transition to a market economy. A few years later Denso, Alcoa, Philips, and Sanmina-SCI Corporation also settled in the city.

Culture

 Architecture 

 Historical centre (Baroque, Classical) buildings
 St Stephen Cathedral and ruins of Székesfehérvár Basilica (one of the largest basilicas in medieval Europe), where the Diets were held and the crown jewels kept, seat for the coronation of the Hungarian monarch and location of royal burials and memorials.
 St Anna Chapel (Gothic, built around 1470)
 "Ruin Garden": Ruins of medieval church founded by St Stephen
 Episcopal Palace (Zopf style)
 City Hall
 Zichy Palace (Zopf style manor house, 1781)
 Serbian Quarter (12 thatched peasant houses and a Byzantine-style church, won a Europa Nostra award in 1990)
 Bory Castle (20th century). A fantastic castle-like structure built by the sculptor Jenő Bory and his wife with their own hands.
 Vörösmarty Theater, the oldest theater of the country

Statues and memorials
 Golden Bull memorial. The Golden Bull was an important charter of King András II, it was released here; the memorial is from 1972.
 Globus crucifer (a stone image of the royal symbol of power of the same name)
 Statue of György Varkoch at the supposed site of his death at the gates (see above)
 Flower clock
 Railway model exhibition

Museums and galleries
 King István Museum
 Doll Museum
 Black Eagle (Fekete Sas) Pharmacy Museum
 City Museum
 City Gallery
 Csitáry spring (mineral water source)

Population

Ethnic groups (2001 census):
 Hungarians - 95.7%
 Germans - 0.8%
 Roma - 0.5%
 Others - 0.5%
 No answer - 2.4%

Religions (2001 census):
 Roman Catholic - 53.8%. The city stands in the Roman Catholic Diocese of Székesfehérvár
 Calvinist - 12.1%
 Lutheran - 1.9%
 Greek Catholic - 0.5%
 Other (Christian) - 1%
 Other (non-Christian) - 0.2%
 Atheists - 19.7%
 No answer, unknown - 10.7%

Politics
The current mayor of Székesfehérvár is András Cser-Palkovics (Fidesz).

The local Municipal Assembly, elected at the 2019 local government elections, is made up of 21 members (1 Mayor, 14 Individual constituencies MEPs and 6 Compensation List MEPs) divided into this political parties and alliances:

List of mayors
List of City Mayors from 1990:

Transport

Székesfehérvár is an important hub for the Hungarian railway system (MÁV). Trains depart to the northern and southern coasts of Lake Balaton and towards the capital. The city is also reachable by regional buses from other major national destinations. There are numerous local buslines operating 7 days a week, operated by the company that also operates the regional buses in the region, KNYKK Zrt. (Közép-Nyugat Magyarországi Közlekedési Központ).Sport
Alba Regia Sportcsarnok is an indoor stadium in the city. It hosts a number of sport clubs from amateur to professional level, with 2017 Hungarian basketball championship winner Alba Fehérvár being its most notable tenant.

Other city sports clubs include:
 Videoton FC (football)
 Székesfehérvári MÁV Előre SC (football)
 Fehérvár AV19 (ice hockey)
 Alba Fehérvár KC (handball)
 Fehérvár Enthroners (American Football)
 Székesfehérvári Kempo SE (martial arts)
 Profi Kempo Akadémia - PKA

Notable people
Born in Székesfehérvár

Béla Balogh (1885-1945), film director
Katalin Bogyay (b. 1956), journalist, diplomat
Bendegúz Bolla (b. 1999), footballer
Jenő Bory (1879-1959), sculptor, architect
István Deák (1926-2023), historian
Dávid Disztl (b. 1985), football player
George Fisher, Serbian leader of the Texas Revolution
Ignác Goldziher, orientalist
Katarina Ivanović, early 19th century Serbian Biedermeier painter
Péter Kuczka, writer
Kornél Lánczos, physicist
George Lang, restaurateur
Lőrinc Mészáros, richest person in Hungary, former politician close to Fidesz
Zsolt Nagy, footballer
Viktor Orbán, Prime Minister of Hungary in 1998—2002 and 2010–present
Lajos Simicska, business magnate, former politician of Fidesz
Bálint Szabó, football player
Gyula Szekfű, historian
Dominik Szoboszlai, football player
Márk Tamás, football player
Miklós Ybl, architect

Buried royalty

Prince Saint Emeric of Hungary (1031)
King Saint Stephen (1038)
Coloman the Bookish (1116)
Álmos the Blind (1129)
Béla the Blind (1141)
Géza II (1162)
Stephen IV (1165)
Agnes of Antioch (1184)
Béla III (1196)
Ladislaus III (1205)
Charles I of Hungary (1342)
Louis the Great (1382)
Albert the Magnanimous (1439)
Matthias Corvinus (1490)
Vladislaus II of Bohemia and Hungary (1516)
Louis II (1526)

Fictional
Albert Horn, character in Louis Malle's film Lacombe, Lucien''.

Twin towns – sister cities

Székesfehérvár is twinned with:

  Alba Iulia, Romania
  Biograd na Moru, Croatia
  Birmingham, United States
  Blagoevgrad, Bulgaria
  Bratislava, Slovakia
  Cento, Italy
  Chorley, England, United Kingdom
  Erdenet, Mongolia
  Kemi, Finland
  Kocaeli, Turkey
  Luhansk, Ukraine
  Miercurea Ciuc, Romania
  Opole, Poland
  Schwäbisch Gmünd, Germany
  Zadar, Croatia

See also 
 Alba Iulia

References
 Székesfehérvár, a királyi város (Székesfehérvár, the royal city)

Notes

External links

 Székesfehérvár official site 

 
County seats in Hungary
Cities with county rights of Hungary
Populated places in Fejér County
972 establishments
Former capitals of Hungary
Populated places established in the 10th century
Serb communities in Hungary
10th-century establishments in Hungary